The Enthusiasts are a Canadian garage rock band from Winnipeg, Manitoba, active from 1963 to 1972. considered one of the most influential underground Canadian Rock groups of the 20th Century, the band's style paved the way for the first waves of Canadian Punk Rock and Art Rock. The Enthusiasts are considered pioneers of Indie Rock as well. while the band saw little mainstream success outside of their native Canada, their influence on later music scenes would be tremendous, especially during the 1980s. The Band has been disbanded since early 1972, although they briefly united for a short Canadian tour in 1984. Currently there are no plans for any further Enthusiasts reunions.

History 
Formed in February 1963 by guitarist and vocalist Joseph Farber, drummer Dylan Handelman and bassist Maxwell Goldstein while the trio were attending the University of Manitoba. Farber and Handelman, childhood friends had been playing rock and roll music together since 1954 and collaborated in various Winnipeg area rock groups throughout the 1950s, most notably The Manitoba Mooseman. Goldstein, originally from Fort William, Ontario and a Sophomore at the University in 1963, was a classically trained musician that shared similar Garage Rock tastes to that of Farber and Handelman. with the lineup of Farber, Handelman and Goldstein complete by March 1963, the band began to play regularly around Winnipeg by May of that year.

By June 1963, the band's debut single, "Knockin" b/w "Selfish Girl" had been recorded and self-released by the band. A smash hit in the Canadian college underground, it would later become a monument of early garage rock. It was also around this time that the band began their relationship with longtime friend, Dr. Adeen Khokhar, who after graduating from University of Manitoba's School of Medicine became a noted Pakistani-Canadian record producer. He also played the harmonica for the band on several occasions.

However, by April 1964, Maxwell Goldstein would part ways with Farber and Handelman, due to musical differences, and to focus more on his other band, Mamojam, who later in the 1960s would go on to become one of the founders instrumental rock. The Split between Goldstein and The Enthusiasts was amicable, as The Enthusiasts would later collaborate and tour extensively with Mamojam.

Replacing Goldstein was longtime friend of the band, Matthew "G" Giordano. the lineup of Farber, Handelman and Giordano would become the quintessential Enthusiasts lineup. By mid 1964. the band began to tour extensively record their debut album, Black Magic. Produced by Khokhar, Black Magic was released in May 1965 to stellar reviews in the Canadian music press.

The band's second LP, Face Turn Blue, dropped during July 1967 at the height of the Summer of Love. While some psychedelic influences are detectable in the sound of the album, it remained at its heart, a raw garage rock record. It was this seemingly perfect blend of raw rock and roll and psychedelic music that garnered generally favorable reviews of the album.

From 1966 until the band's break up in 1972 the Enthusiasts embarked on a heavy touring schedule, playing non stop around Canada, the United States and Europe. during this regimen of nonstop touring The Enthusiasts first Live album entitled Minimize the Lyrics was released. recorded live from Gillet Auditorium at Hunter College in the Bronx, New York in October 1966, it was released by Bunghole Records in March 1968. The band's next LP, Strange Combination, was released in 1969, and their final LP, Evil Road was released in 1971. After eight years of constant activity, the band decided to disband in January 1972 to focus on new musical directions, that would later manifest in Farber and Handelman's later band Red Pop. The final Enthusiasts concert took place in Winnipeg on April 4, 1972.

Personnel 

Joseph "Joey" Farber, guitar and vocals (1963–72)

Dylan "DH" Handelman, drums (1963–72)

Maxwell "Max" Goldstein, bass (1963–64)

Adeen "Doc" Khokhar, harmonica (1963–72)

Matthew "G" Giordano, bass (1964–72)

Discography 

 Albums

Black Magic (1965)
Carboard Soldiers EP (1966)
Face Turn Blue (1967)
Minimize the Lyrics (1968)
Strange Combination (1969)
Evil Road (1971)

 Singles

"Knocking" b/w "Selfish Girl" (1963)
"Itchy" b/w "Cannon" (1964)

References

Musical groups established in 1963
Musical groups disestablished in 1972
Musical groups from Winnipeg
Canadian garage rock groups
1963 establishments in Manitoba
1972 disestablishments in Canada